
Hinton  may refer to:

Places

Australia
Hinton, New South Wales

Canada
Hinton, Alberta
Hinton/Entrance Airport
Hinton/Jasper-Hinton Airport
Hinton CN railway station

England
Hinton, Dorset, a civil parish
Hinton Martell, Dorset
Hinton Parva, Dorset
Hinton, South Gloucestershire, Gloucestershire
Hinton, Stroud, Gloucestershire, a village near Berkeley
Hinton, Hampshire
Hinton, Herefordshire
Hinton, Northamptonshire
Hinton, Shropshire
Hinton, Somerset
Hinton, Suffolk
Hinton Admiral, Hampshire
Hinton Admiral railway station
Hinton Ampner, Hampshire
Hinton Blewett, Somerset
Hinton Charterhouse, Somerset
Hinton Daubney, Hampshire
Hinton Parva, Wiltshire, also known as Little Hinton
Hinton St George, Somerset
Hinton St Mary, Dorset
Hinton Waldrist, Oxfordshire
Hinton-in-the-Hedges, Northamptonshire
Hinton on the Green, Worcestershire
Broad Hinton, Wiltshire
Cherry Hinton, Cambridgeshire
Great Hinton, Wiltshire
Tarrant Hinton, Dorset

United States
Hinton, California
Hinton, Iowa
Hinton, Missouri
Hinton, Oklahoma
Hinton, West Virginia
Hinton (Amtrak station)
Hinton Township, Michigan

Other
Hinton (name)
Hinton station (disambiguation), railroad stations of the name